Arnulf Schröder (born Munich, June 13, 1903 - died there, December 22, 1960) was a German actor and director.  He studied at the Oberrealschule with Claire Bauroff.  He spent some of his career working in the cabarets of Berlin.

Selected filmography
 The Unsuspecting Angel (1936)
 Meiseken (1937)
 Red Orchids (1938)
 Water for Canitoga (1939)
 Enemies (1940)
 Chased by the Devil (1950)
 Immortal Light (1951)
 Arlette Conquers Paris (1953)
 The Missing Miniature (1954)
 Royal Hunt in Ischl (1955)
 San Salvatore (1956)
 Taiga (1958)
 The Domestic Tyrant (1959)
 Oh! This Bavaria! (1960)

References
Biography with photo (in German)

1903 births
1960 deaths
German male film actors
Male actors from Munich
20th-century German male actors